Li Li-hua (17 July 1924 – 19 March 2017) was a Chinese actress, better known as an actress from the Shaw Brothers Studio. In 1957, Li married Hong Kong actor and director Yan Jun (嚴俊) (December 17, 1917 – August 18, 1980).

Life and career
Li Li-hua was born on July 17, 1924 in Shanghai. She was the daughter of famous Beijing Opera actor Li Guifang (李桂芳). At age 12 she moved to Beijing and studied Beijing Opera. Four years later she moved to Shanghai and joined the Yihua Film Company. Her first movie was 3 Smiles (三笑) which was released in two parts in 1940. Her final movie was New Dream of the Red Chamber (新紅樓夢) in 1978, after which she retired and moved to the United States. She acted in over one hundred twenty movies during her 38-year career. In 1969 she was awarded the Golden Horse Best Actress award for Storm over the Yangtze River (揚子江風雲). In 2015 she was awarded the Lifetime Achievement Award at the 52nd Golden Horse Awards. In April 2016 she was honored with a Hong Kong Film Awards Lifetime Achievement Award. She died on 19 March 2017, aged 92.

Sources

References

External links

1924 births
2017 deaths
Actresses from Shanghai
Taiwanese film actresses
Chinese emigrants to Taiwan
Chinese Civil War refugees
20th-century Chinese women singers
Taiwanese emigrants to the United States
Pathé Records (China) artists
Pathé Records (Hong Kong) artists
Shaw Brothers Studio